The 1972 United States presidential election in Minnesota took place on November 7, 1972, as part of the 1972 United States presidential election. Voters chose ten electors, or representatives to the Electoral College, who voted for president and vice president.

Minnesota was won by the Republican Party candidate, incumbent President Richard Nixon, who won the state over U.S. Senator George McGovern of South Dakota by a margin of 95,923 votes, or 5.51%, the closest state in the election. This result made Minnesota around 18% more Democratic than the nation as a whole. Nixon went on to win the election nationally, by a landslide margin of 23.15% of the popular vote. McGovern carried only Massachusetts and the District of Columbia.

The 1972 election was the last time Minnesota—a state which has generally favored Democrats since the New Deal—was carried by a Republican. This state would go on to have the longest streak voting for Democrats out of any starting after this election, as every other state would be won by Ronald Reagan in the landslide year of 1984. During Nixon's second term as President, the Watergate scandal resulted in the loss of the Republican Party's credibility both nationally and in Minnesota. The damage caused by Watergate was so pronounced that the Republican Party of Minnesota was forced to rebrand itself as the "Independent-Republican Party" from 1975 to 1995 to distance itself from the national Republican Party.

Nixon also remains the last Republican to carry heavily populated Hennepin County, with 1972 also the last time that county did not vote the same as neighboring Ramsey County.

Results

Results by county

See also
 United States presidential elections in Minnesota

References

1972
Minnesota
1972 Minnesota elections